Banna may refer to: 

Banna (Battagram), a town in Khyber Pakhtunkhwa, Pakistan
Banna (Birdoswald), a Roman Birdoswald in Cumbria in England
Banna, Bangladesh, a town in Barisal, Bangladesh
Banna, Ilocos Norte, a municipality in the Philippines
Banna Strand, a beach in Country Kerry, Ireland
Ban Na district, a district in Nakhon Nayok Province, Thailand
Om Banna, a shrine located in Pali district near Jodhpur, India
Xishuangbanna Dai Autonomous Prefecture, commonly shorted to Banna, a prefecture in Yunnan, China

See also
 al-Banna
 Banner (disambiguation)